Chang Qing (born 1 November 1966) is a Chinese former swimmer who competed in the 1988 Summer Olympics.

After he left the Chinese national team, he became a coach for Win Tin Swimming Club (WTSC).

References

1966 births
Living people
Chinese male breaststroke swimmers
Olympic swimmers of China
Swimmers at the 1988 Summer Olympics
20th-century Chinese people